In cosmology, the steady-state model, or steady state theory is an alternative to the Big Bang theory of evolution of the universe. In the steady-state model, the density of matter in the expanding universe remains unchanged due to a continuous creation of matter,  thus adhering to the perfect cosmological principle, a principle that asserts that the observable universe is practically the same at any time and any place.

While from the 1940s to the 1960s the astrophysical community was equally divided between supporters of the Big Bang theory and supporters of the steady-state theory, it is now rejected by the vast majority of cosmologists, astrophysicists and astronomers, as the observational evidence points to a hot Big Bang cosmology with a finite age of the universe, which the steady-state model does not predict.

History

In the 13th century, Siger of Brabant authored the thesis The Eternity of the World, which argued that there was no first man, and no first specimen of any particular: the physical universe is thus without any first beginning, and therefore eternal. Siger's views were condemned by the pope in 1277.

Cosmological expansion was originally discovered through observations by Edwin Hubble. Theoretical calculations also showed that the static universe as modeled by Einstein (1917) was unstable. The modern Big Bang theory, first advanced by Father Georges Lemaître, is one in which the universe has a finite age and has evolved over time through cooling, expansion, and the formation of structures through gravitational collapse.

The steady-state model asserts that although the universe is expanding, it nevertheless does not change its appearance over time (the perfect cosmological principle); the universe has no beginning and no end. This required that matter be continually created in order to keep the universe's density from decreasing. Influential papers on steady-state cosmologies were published by Hermann Bondi, Thomas Gold, and Fred Hoyle in 1948. Similar models had been proposed earlier by William Duncan MacMillan, among others.

It is now known that Albert Einstein considered a steady-state model of the expanding universe, as indicated in a 1931 manuscript, many years before Hoyle, Bondi and Gold. However, he quickly abandoned the idea.

Observational tests

Counts of radio sources

Problems with the steady-state model began to emerge in the 1950s and 60s, when observations began to support the idea that the universe was in fact changing: bright radio sources (quasars and radio galaxies) were found only at large distances (therefore could have existed only in the distant past due to the effects of the speed of light on astronomy), not in closer galaxies.  Whereas the Big Bang theory predicted as much, the steady-state model predicted that such objects would be found throughout the universe, including close to our own galaxy. By 1961, statistical tests based on radio-source surveys had ruled out the steady-state model in the minds of most cosmologists, although some proponents of the steady state insisted that the radio data were suspect.

Cosmic microwave background
For most cosmologists, the definitive refutation of the steady-state model came with the discovery of the cosmic microwave background radiation in 1964, which was predicted by the Big Bang theory. The steady-state model explained microwave background radiation as the result of light from ancient stars that has been scattered by galactic dust.  However, the cosmic microwave background level is very even in all directions, making it difficult to explain how it could be generated by numerous point sources, and the microwave background radiation shows no evidence of characteristics such as polarization that are normally associated with scattering. Furthermore, its spectrum is so close to that of an ideal black body that it could hardly be formed by the superposition of contributions from a multitude of dust clumps at different temperatures as well as at different redshifts. Steven Weinberg wrote in 1972,
The steady state model does not appear to agree with the observed dL versus z relation or with source counts ... In a sense, this disagreement is a credit to the model; alone among all cosmologies, the steady state model makes such definite predictions that it can be disproved even with the limited observational evidence at our disposal. The steady state model is so attractive that many of its adherents still retain hope that the evidence against it will eventually disappear as observations improve. However, if the cosmic microwave radiation ... is really black-body radiation, it will be difficult to doubt that the universe has evolved from a hotter denser early stage.

Since this discovery, the Big Bang theory has been considered to provide the best explanation of the origin of the universe. In most astrophysical publications, the Big Bang is implicitly accepted and is used as the basis of more complete theories.

Violations of the cosmological principle

One of the fundamental assumptions of the steady-state model is the cosmological principle, which follows from the perfect cosmological principle and which states that our observational location in the universe is not unusual or special; on a large-enough scale, the universe looks the same in all directions (isotropy) and from every location (homogeneity). However, recent findings have suggested that violations of the cosmological principle, especially of isotropy, exist, with some authors suggesting that the cosmological principle is now obsolete.

Violations of isotropy
Evidence from galaxy clusters, quasars, and type Ia supernovae suggest that isotropy is violated on large scales. 

Data from the Planck Mission shows hemispheric bias in the cosmic microwave background (CMB) in two respects: one with respect to average temperature (i.e. temperature fluctuations), the second with respect to larger variations in the degree of perturbations (i.e. densities). The European Space Agency (the governing body of the Planck Mission) has concluded that these anisotropies in the  CMB are, in fact, statistically significant and can no longer be ignored. 

Already in 1967, Dennis Sciama predicted that the CMB has a significant dipole anisotropy. In recent years the CMB dipole has been tested and current results suggest our motion with respect to distant radio galaxies  and quasars  differs from our motion with respect to the CMB. The same conclusion has been reached in recent studies of the Hubble diagram of Type Ia supernovae and quasars. This contradicts the cosmological principle.

The CMB dipole is hinted at through a number of other observations. First, even within the CMB, there are curious directional alignments  and an anomalous parity asymmetry  that may have an origin in the CMB dipole. Separately, the CMB dipole direction has emerged as a preferred direction in studies of alignments in quasar polarizations, scaling relations in galaxy clusters, strong lensing time delay, Type Ia supernovae, and quasars & gamma-ray bursts as standard candles. The fact that all these independent observables, based on different physics, are tracking the CMB dipole direction suggests that the Universe is anisotropic in the direction of the CMB dipole.

Nevertheless, some authors have stated that the universe around Earth is isotropic at high significance by studies of the cosmic microwave background temperature maps.

Violations of homogeneity
Many large-scale structures have been discovered, and some authors have reported some of the structures to be in conflict with the homogeneity condition required for the cosmological principle, including
 The Clowes–Campusano LQG, discovered in 1991, which has a length of 580 Mpc
 The Sloan Great Wall, discovered in 2003, which has a length of 423 Mpc, 
 U1.11, a large quasar group discovered in 2011, which has a length of 780 Mpc
 The Huge-LQG, discovered in 2012, which is three times longer than and twice as wide as is predicted possible according to ΛCDM
 The Hercules–Corona Borealis Great Wall, discovered in November 2013, which has a length of 2000–3000 Mpc (more than seven times that of the SGW)
The Giant Arc, discovered in June 2021, which has a length of 1000 Mpc 

Other authors claim that the existence of large-scale structures does not necessarily violate the cosmological principle.

Tolman surface brightness test

The steady-state model assumes that the universe is expanding. The Tolman surface brightness test is a test which compares the surface brightness of galaxies as a function of their redshift to distinguish between cosmological models in which the universe is expanding or static. In 2014, a group of researchers analysed the surface brightness of galaxies up to redshift  and found that a static universe is preferred over an expanding universe. However, the analysis was unable to completely rule out the expanding universe scenario.

Quasi-steady state
Quasi-steady-state cosmology (QSS) was proposed in 1993 by Fred Hoyle, Geoffrey Burbidge, and Jayant V. Narlikar as a new incarnation of the steady-state ideas meant to explain additional features unaccounted for in the initial proposal. The model suggests pockets of creation occurring over time within the universe, sometimes referred to as minibangs, mini-creation events, or little bangs. After the observation of an accelerating universe, further modifications of the model were made. The Planck particle is a hypothetical black hole whose Schwarzschild radius is approximately the same as its Compton wavelength; the evaporation of such a particle has been evoked as the source of light elements in an expanding steady-state universe.

Astrophysicist and cosmologist Ned Wright has pointed out flaws in the model. These first comments were soon rebutted by the proponents. Wright and other mainstream cosmologists reviewing QSS have pointed out new flaws and discrepancies with observations left unexplained by proponents.

See also
 Non-standard cosmology
 Background independence
 Copernican principle
 End of Greatness
 Large scale structure of the cosmos
 Metric expansion of space

Notes and citations

Further reading
 Burbidge, G., Hoyle, F., "The Origin of Helium and the Other Light Elements", The Astrophysical Journal, 509:L1–L3, 10 December 1998

Physical cosmology
Obsolete theories in physics
Cosmogony
1948 in science